The Tohoratea River is a short river of the Gisborne Region of New Zealand's North Island. It flows southeast from its origins south of Ruatoria to reach the Pacific Ocean to the north of Waipiro Bay.

See also
List of rivers of New Zealand

References

Rivers of the Gisborne District
Rivers of New Zealand